Vietnamocalamus is a genus of flowering plants belonging to the family Poaceae.

Its native range is Vietnam.

Species:
 Vietnamocalamus catbaensis T.Q.Nguyen

References

Poaceae
Poaceae genera